"Cradle to the Grave" is a 1994 song by Tupac Shakur.

Cradle to the Grave, or similar, may also refer to:

Music
 "Cradle to the Grave", a 1987 song by Motörhead from the single Eat the Rich
 "Cradle to the Grave", a 1995 song by Mobb Deep from The Infamous
 Cradle to the Grave (album), a 2015 album by Squeeze

TV
 "Cradle to Grave", a 2008 episode of the TV series Back to You
 Cradle to Grave, a 2015 sitcom based on a fictionalised version of the autobiography of Danny Baker

Films
 Cradle 2 the Grave, a 2003 action film

Miscelleanous
 Cradle-to-grave analysis or life cycle assessment, an analysis of the environmental impact of a product or service
 Whole-life cost, or "cradle to grave" cost, the total cost of ownership over the life of an asset

See also
 From the Cradle to the Grave (disambiguation)
 Beveridge Report, an influential document in the founding of the welfare state in the United Kingdom